Mahdiyeh (also Romanized as Mahdīyeh; also known as Mehdīābād) is a village in Derak Rural District, in the Central District of Shiraz County, Fars Province, Iran. At the 2006 census, its population was 2,206, in 533 families.

References 

Populated places in Shiraz County